Hilda Gwendolyn Strike (later Sisson, September 1, 1910 – March 9, 1989) was a Canadian track athlete and Olympic medalist. She was born in Montreal and died in Ottawa.

Competing in the 1932 Summer Olympics, she won a silver medal in the 4×100 metre relay and a silver medal in the 100 metre losing to Stanisława Walasiewicz. At the end of the year, she was named Canada's outstanding female athlete of the year by The Canadian Press. In 1972, she was inducted into Canada's Sports Hall of Fame.

When Walasiewicz was shot to death in 1980 during a store robbery, it was discovered that Walasiewicz had an intersex condition. Many subsequently argued that the gold medal should be given to Strike.

At the 1934 Empire Games she won the silver medal in the 100 yards event. She also was a member of the Canadian relay team which won the silver medal in the 110-220-110 yards relay competition.

References
 1932 'injustice' never corrected: A Canadian Olympic sprinter lost the gold to a woman, who later turned out to be a man. David Reevely reports.; [Final Edition] David Reevely. The Ottawa Citizen. Ottawa, Ont.: Feb 17, 2002. pg. A.3
 Sisson never demanded gold medal; The Ottawa Citizen. Ottawa, Ont.: Mar 11, 1989. pg. F.5

External links

References

1910 births
1989 deaths
Canadian female sprinters
Olympic track and field athletes of Canada
Athletes (track and field) at the 1932 Summer Olympics
Olympic silver medalists for Canada
Athletes (track and field) at the 1934 British Empire Games
Commonwealth Games silver medallists for Canada
Commonwealth Games medallists in athletics
Athletes from Montreal
Athletes from Ottawa
Medalists at the 1932 Summer Olympics
Olympic silver medalists in athletics (track and field)
Olympic female sprinters
Medallists at the 1934 British Empire Games